Sankhar is a rural locality (a settlement) in Gorod Vyazniki, Vyaznikovsky District, Vladimir Oblast, Russia. The population was 49 as of 2010.

Geography 
Sankhar is located on the Sankhar Lake, 95 km northeast of Vyazniki (the district's administrative centre) by road. Frolishchi is the nearest rural locality.

References 

Rural localities in Vyaznikovsky District